The Windsor Link Line or Windsor Link Railway may refer to:

Windsor Link Line, Manchester, a short railway line in Manchester, United Kingdom
Windsor Link Railway, a proposed railway in Windsor, United Kingdom
St Kilda - Windsor railway line, a disused railway in Melbourne, Australia